Porosphaerella is a genus consisting of (possibly only one) or three species of fungi in the family Cordanaceae.

Was formerly in the Chaetosphaeriaceae family.

References

External links

Sordariomycetes genera
Chaetosphaeriales